Cychrus hampei is a species of ground beetle in the subfamily of Carabinae that can be found in Croatia and in Bosnia and Herzegovina.

References

hampei
Beetles described in 1875
Beetles of Europe